The Austrian Science Fund is the most important Austrian funding organization for basic research. The FWF supports research in science, engineering, and the humanities through a large variety of grant programmes, prizes and by funding infrastructure. The self-governed organization is based in Vienna and financed by the Austrian federal government.

Organisation

The Austrian Science Fund was established in 1967 and had a budget of 91 million euros in 2001. Most projects are individual research grants for up to three years. In addition, it also supports national research clusters, doctoral schools, scholarships for young researchers and awards like the START- and Wittgenstein-Preis. Pascale Ehrenfreund was elected president of the FWF  on 6 June 2013. In recent years, the Austrian Science Fund provides growing support for the publication of articles and monographs in the open access format.

Membership 

The Austrian Science Fund is a member of the European Science Foundation.

See also
 Open access in Austria

References

External links
 official website 
 Science in Austria, 2002-06

Scientific organisations based in Austria
Organizations established in 1967
Organisations based in Vienna
1967 establishments in Austria
Research funding agencies